Nukoolkit Krutyai (born September 23, 1992) is a Thai professional footballer who plays as a centre-back for Thai League 1 club PT Prachuap.

Honours

Club
BEC Tero Sasana
 Thai League Cup
  Winner (1) : 2014

Buriram United
 Thai League 1 
  Champions (1) : 2015
 Thai FA Cup 
  Winners (1) : 2015
 Thai League Cup 
  Winners (1) : 2015 
 Toyota Premier Cup
  Winner (1) : 2016
 Kor Royal Cup 
  Winners (2) : 2015, 2016
 Mekong Club Championship
  Winner (1) : 2015

Muangthong United
 Thai League Cup 
  Winners (1) :  2017
 Mekong Club Championship
  Winner (1) : 2017

External links
 
Profile at Goal

1992 births
Living people
Nukoolkit Krutyai
Nukoolkit Krutyai
Association football defenders
Nukoolkit Krutyai
Nukoolkit Krutyai
Nukoolkit Krutyai
Nukoolkit Krutyai